The Protection Island mining disaster killed 16 miners and occurred on Protection Island near Nanaimo, British Columbia, Canada. The disaster occurred at 7:10a.m. on  when the hoisting cable frayed on the cab that was lowering miners into the mine. Six other cabs of 16 miners each had preceded the cab which fell 300 feet into the mine. The bodies of the miners were mangled to the point where personal effects were used to identify the victims. It was later determined that salt water in the air had caused corrosion of the cable leading to the accident.

See also

1887 Nanaimo mine explosion
List of coal mines and landmarks in the Nanaimo area

References

Nanaimo
Mining in British Columbia
1918 disasters in Canada
Mid Vancouver Island
History of Vancouver Island